Tyner (historically, Tynerville or Tyners Station) is a neighborhood in Hamilton County, Tennessee, United States. Formerly a separate community, Tyner is located within Chattanooga's present city limits, and is today considered a neighborhood of Chattanooga.

Education
 Tyner Academy
 Tyner Middle Academy

Industry
Enterprise South Industrial Park is located in Tyner.

References

Neighborhoods in Chattanooga, Tennessee